Norfolk—Beautiful Plains is a former provincial electoral division in Manitoba, Canada.  It was created for the 1949 provincial election by a merger of the Norfolk and Beautiful Plains constituencies, and eliminated with the 1958 provincial election.

Provincial representatives

Former provincial electoral districts of Manitoba